Lorca Deportiva Club de Fútbol B was a Spanish football club, based in Lorca, Region of Murcia. Founded on 2005 and dissolved in 2009, it was the reserve team of Lorca Deportiva CF.

History
Lorca Deportiva reserve team was founded in 2005. It was dissolved in 2009 when the first team was relegated to Tercera División. The reserve team was not registered in Preferente and consequently was dissolved.

Season to season

2 seasons in Tercera División

External links
Lorca Deportiva CF Official Website

 
Association football clubs established in 2005
Association football clubs disestablished in 2009
Spanish reserve football teams
Defunct football clubs in the Region of Murcia
2005 establishments in Spain
2009 disestablishments in Spain